Sammy is a nickname, frequently for people named Samuel or Samantha, and also an English spelling of the Arabic name Sami.

People

Music
Sammy Adams (born 1987), American rapper and songwriter
Sammy Cahn (1913-1993), American songwriter
Sammy Davis Jr. (1925-1990), American singer and actor
Sammy Fain (1902-1984), American composer
Sammy Hagar (born 1947), American rock musician
Sammy Johns (1946–2013), American country singer-songwriter
Sammy Kershaw (born 1958), American country music artist
Sammy Masters (1930–2013), American rockabilly musician
Sammy Price (1908-1992), American jazz, boogie-woogie and jump blues pianist and bandleader.

Sports
Sammy Adjei (born 1980), Ghanaian retired footballer
Sammy Baugh (1914-2008), American college and Hall-of-Fame National Football League player and coach
Sammy Brooks (footballer) (1890-1960), English footballer
Sammy Carlson (born 1989), American freestyle skier
Sammy Collins (1923–1998), English footballer
Samuel Day (sportsman) (1878–1950), English amateur cricketer and footballer
Sammy Davis (American football) (born 1980), American former National Football League player
Sammy Korir (born 1971), Kenyan long-distance runner
Sammy Lee (diver) (1920–2016), Korean-American diver and two-time Olympic Games champion
Sammy Lee (footballer) (born 1959), former Liverpool footballer and former Bolton Wanderers manager
Satoru Sayama (born 1957), Japanese wrestler with the stage name "Sammy Lee"
Sammy Luftspring (1916-2000), Canadian boxer
Sammy Mandell (1904-1967), American world lightweight champion boxer
Sammy McIlroy (born 1954), Northern Ireland footballer
Sammy Price (American football) (born 1943), American former National Football League player
Sammy Kibet Rotich (born 1980), Kenyan long-distance runner
Sammy Solís (born 1988), American professional baseball player
Sammy Sosa (born 1968), Dominican baseball player
Sammy Soviero (Sportsman)(born 1991), Italy-Champion WKF (Worl karatè Federation)
Sammy Stewart (born 1954), American former Major League Baseball pitcher
Sammy Stewart (footballer, born 1920) (1920–1995), Scottish footballer
Sammy Stewart (footballer, born 1991), Northern Irish footballer
Sammy Traoré (born 1976), French and Malian footballer
Sammy Watkins (born 1993), American National Football League player
Sammy White (American football) (born 1954), American former National Football League player

Other
Sammy Albon (born 1992), British YouTuber and radio personality
Sammy Brooks (1891–1951), American film actor
Sammy Davis Sr. (1900-1988), American dancer, father of Sammy Davis Jr.
Sammy Tak Lee (born 1939), Hong Kong billionaire property developer
Sammy Lee (choreographer), Oscar-nominated choreographer of Ali Baba Goes to Town
Sammy Lee (scientist) (1958–2012), expert in in vitro fertilisation
 Sammy Wilson (politician) (born 1953), British MP from Northern Ireland
Sammy Younge Jr. (1944–1966), murdered African-American civil rights activist

Fictional characters
Sammy Jo Carrington, on the American TV show Dynasty
 Sammy Fabelman, the main protagonist of Steven Spielberg's semi-autobiographical film The Fabelmans
Sammy Lawrence, a minor antagonist in the Bendy and the Ink Machine video game series
Sammy the Owl, official mascot of the athletics teams of Rice University
Sammy the Shunter, locomotive in the children's books by Eileen Gibb

See also
Sam (disambiguation)
Sammie (name)

Lists of people by nickname
Masculine given names
Hypocorisms
English masculine given names